Balcalı is a village in the Karakoçan District of Elazığ Province in Turkey. Its population is 77 (2021). The village is populated by Kurds.

References

Villages in Karakoçan District
Kurdish settlements in Elazığ Province